The Taipei No.1 is a residential skyscraper complex completed in 2008 and located in Sanchong District, New Taipei, Taiwan. When completed, the building was the tallest in the district until it was surpassed by Chicony Electronics Headquarters in 2013. Taipei No.1 is located on the bank of Tamsui River, one bridge away from Taipei city. The complex was constructed under strict requirements of preventing damage caused by earthquakes and typhoons common in Taiwan.

See also 
 List of tallest buildings in Taiwan
 List of tallest buildings in New Taipei City

References

2008 establishments in Taiwan
Residential skyscrapers in Taiwan
Skyscrapers in New Taipei
Apartment buildings in Taiwan
Residential buildings completed in 2008